Ann Moura (born August 20 1947) is an author of books about magic, religion and Neo-Paganism. She calls her witchcraft tradition Green Witchcraft, and has written several books about it. Her public Craft name is Aoumiel.

Ann Moura has been a solitary practitioner of Green Witchcraft for over forty-five years. According to Moura, her mother and grandmother practiced witchcraft, which makes her a hereditary witch. Her mother and grandmother were Brazilians of Spanish descent, and Ann Moura considers their tradition Celtic-Iberian. Unlike them, Moura doesn't include names of Christian saints to her witchcraft practice. Instead, she uses names of Pagan deities because she believes that the family's witchcraft tradition was originally Pagan.

The death of Moura's mother prompted her to write about Green Witchcraft. She wanted to pass along the things she had learned from her mother and grandmother. Her mother and grandmother passed down information as matters came up rather than as a complete, formal education. Moura was worried that the knowledge moving from one generation to the next was getting slimmer. Green Witchcraft as presented by Moura also contains information discovered by Moura herself.

Moura holds both Bachelor of Arts and Master of Arts degrees in history. She is a certified Archivist, and has been a Navy Lieutenant and a high school history teacher. She runs her own metaphysical store. She is married, and has two children. She lives in Florida.


Bibliography

Books about Green Witchcraft
 Green Witchcraft: Folk Magic, Fairy Lore & Herb Craft (1996) Llewellyn Publications , 
 translated in German as Naturmagie: Die Grüne Hexenkunst Silberschnur , 
 translated in Italian as Stregoneria verde: Magia popolare, tradizioni fatate e l'arte delle erbe Elfi , 
 Green Witchcraft II: Balancing Light & Shadow (1999) Llewellyn Publications , 
 translated in Italian as Stregoneria verde 2: L'equilibrio tra luce ed ombra Elfi , 
 Green Witchcraft III: The Manual (2000) Llewellyn Publications , 
 Green Magic: The Sacred Connection to Nature (2002) Llewellyn Publications , 
 Grimoire for the Green Witch: A Complete Book of Shadows (2003) Llewellyn Publications , 
 Tarot for the Green Witch (2003) Llewellyn Publications , 
 Mansions of the Moon for the Green Witch: A Complete Book of Lunar Magic (2010) Llewellyn Publications ,

Other books
 Dancing Shadows: The Roots of Western Religious Beliefs (1995) Llewellyn Publications , 
 Origins Of Modern Witchcraft: The Evolution of a World Religion (2000) Llewellyn Publications , 
 Witchcraft: An Alternative Path (2003) Llewellyn Publications , 
 translated in French as Sorcellerie : Une voie alternative , 
 Ann Moura's New History of Witchcraft (2007) 7th House ,

Footnotes

External links
Author's website
Luna Sol Esoterica Author's store in Sanford, FL

1947 births
Living people
American modern pagans
American occult writers
American people of Brazilian descent
Female United States Navy officers
Modern pagan writers
American women non-fiction writers
21st-century American women